Hardin Abner Cathey (July 6, 1919 – July 26, 1997), nicknamed "Lil Abner", was a Major League Baseball pitcher who played for the Washington Senators in .

External links

1919 births
1997 deaths
Major League Baseball pitchers
Baseball players from Tennessee